A.C. Milan won their second consecutive European Cup, thanks to a final victory over Benfica. The Dutch trio of Marco van Basten, Ruud Gullit and Frank Rijkaard was now a firmly established unit, but their efforts were not quite enough to defeat Napoli in the title chase.

Squad

Transfers

Competitions

Serie A

League table

Results by round

Matches

Top scorers
  Marco van Basten 19
  Daniele Massaro 10
  Roberto Donadoni 4
  Alberigo Evani 3
  Carlo Ancelotti 3
  Mauro Tassotti 3

Coppa Italia

First round

Second round

Group stage

Semi-finals

Final

European Cup

First round

Second round

Quarter-finals

Semi-finals

Final

Intercontinental Cup

European Super Cup

Statistics

Player statistics

References

A.C. Milan seasons
Milan
UEFA Champions League-winning seasons